Flight training is a course of study used when learning to pilot an aircraft. The overall purpose of primary and intermediate flight training is the acquisition and honing of basic airmanship skills.

Flight training can be conducted under a structured accredited syllabus with a flight instructor at a flight school or as private lessons with no syllabus with a flight instructor as long as all experience requirements for the desired pilot certificate/license are met.

Typically flight training consists of a combination of two parts: 
 Flight Lessons given in the aircraft or in a certified Flight Training Device .
 Ground School primarily given as a classroom lecture or lesson by a flight instructor where aeronautical theory is learned in preparation for the student's written, oral, and flight pilot certification/licensing examinations.

Although there are various types of aircraft, many of the principles of piloting them have common techniques, especially those aircraft which are heavier-than-air types.

Flight schools commonly rent aircraft to students and licensed pilots at an hourly rate. Typically, the hourly rate is determined by the aircraft's Hobbs meter or Tach timer, therefore the student is only charged while the aircraft engine is running. Flight instructors can also be scheduled with or without an aircraft for pilot proficiency and recurring training.

The oldest flight training school still in existence is the Royal Air Force's (RAF's) Central Flying School formed in May 1912 at Upavon, United Kingdom. The oldest civil flight school still active in the world is based in Germany at the Wasserkuppe. It was founded as "Mertens Fliegerschule", and is currently named "Fliegerschule Wasserkuppe".

Licences

Pilots must first gain their Private Pilot Licence (PPL). They can then progress to a Commercial Pilot Licence (CPL), and finally an Airline Transport Pilot Licence (ATPL).

Some countries have a Light Aircraft Pilot Licence (LAPL), but this cannot be used internationally.

Separate licences are required for different aircraft categories, for example helicopters and aeroplanes.

Ratings

A type rating, also known as an endorsement, is the process undertaken by a pilot to update their license to allow them to fly a different type of aircraft. A class rating covers multiple aircraft.

An instrument rating allows a pilot to fly under instrument flight rules (IFR). A night rating allows a pilot to fly at night (that is, outside of Civil twilight).

See also
Bárány chair
Bachelor of Aviation
Ground Instructor
Integrated pilot training
Pilot licensing and certification
Pilot certification in the United States
Pilot licensing in Canada
Pilot licensing in the United Kingdom

References

External links
Learning to Fly: A Practical Manual for Beginners (1916) by Claude Grahame-White and Harry Harper
Student Pilot Guide from the FAA
Accelerated Flight Training from Flying Mag.
Pilot Training Compass: Back to the Future from European Cockpit Association.

 
Aviation licenses and certifications